Yoshiko Uchida (November 24, 1921 – June 21, 1992) was an award-winning Japanese American writer of children's books based on aspects of Japanese and Japanese American history and culture. A series of books, starting with Journey to Topaz (1971) take place during the era of the mass removal and incarceration of Japanese Americans during WWII. She also authored an adult memoir centering on her and her family's wartime incarceration (Desert Exile, 1982), a young adult version her life story (Invisible Thread, 1991), and a novel centering on a Japanese American family (Picture Bride, 1987).

Early life

Yoshiko Uchida was born in Alameda, California, on November 24, 1921, the daughter of Takashi ("Dwight," 1884-1971) and Iku Umegaki Uchida (1893-1966).  She had an older sister, Keiko ("Kay," 1918-2008, mother of former New York Times book critic Michiko Kakutani and married to mathematician Shizuo Kakutani).  She graduated from high school at sixteen and enrolled at University of California, Berkeley.

Incarceration
The Uchidas lived in Berkeley, California and Yoshiko was in her senior year at U.C. Berkeley when the Japanese attacked the naval base at Pearl Harbor in 1941. Soon after, President Franklin D. Roosevelt ordered all Japanese Americans on the west coast to be rounded up and imprisoned in internment camps. Uchida's father was questioned by the Federal Bureau of Investigation, and the whole family was interned for three years, first at Tanforan Racetrack in California, and then in Topaz, Utah. In the camps, Yoshiko taught school and had the chance to view the injustices that the Americans were perpetrating and the varying reactions of Japanese Americans towards their ill-treatment.

In 1943 Uchida was accepted to graduate school at Smith College in Massachusetts, and allowed to leave the camp, but her years there left a deep impression. Her 1971 novel, Journey to Topaz, is fiction, but closely follows her own experiences, and many of her other books deal with issues of ethnicity, citizenship, identity, and cross-cultural relationships.

Career

Uchida became widely known for her 1982 autobiography Desert Exile, one of several important autobiographical works by Japanese Americans, who were interned that portray internment as a pivotal moment in the formation of the author's personal and cultural identities.

She is also known for her children's novels, having been praised as "almost single-handedly creating a body of Japanese American literature for children, where none existed before." In addition to Journey to Topaz, many of her other novels including Picture Bride, A Jar of Dreams, and The Bracelet deal with Japanese American impressions of major historical events including World War I, the Great Depression, and World War II, and the racism endured by Japanese Americans during these years.

I try to stress the positive aspects of life that I want children to value and cherish. I hope they can be caring human beings who don't think in terms of labels—foreigners or Asians or whatever—but think of people as human beings. If that comes across, then I've accomplished my purpose.

Over the course of her career, Uchida published more than thirty books, including non-fiction for adults, and fiction for children and teenagers. She died in 1992.

Work on Japanese folk pottery
In 1952, Uchida received a Ford Foundation Fellowship to study the folk pottery movement in Japan. She spent two years researching and becoming acquainted with major figures in that artistic current, including Shoji Hamada and Kanjiro Kawai. Uchida wrote a book with Kawai, We Do Not Work Alone: The Thoughts of Kanjiro Kawai. She collected several pots by Hamada and Kawai that she later donated to the Asian Art Museum in San Francisco.

Bibliography
This is a partial list of Uchida's published work.
Yoshiko Uchida wrote 34 books.

 The Dancing Kettle and Other Japanese Folk Tales (1949)
 New Friends for Susan (1951)
 The Magic Listening Cap: More Folk Tales from Japan (1955)
 The Full Circle (1957)
 Takao and Grandfather's Sword (1958)
 The Promised Year (1959)
 Mik and the Prowler (1960)
 Rokubei and the Thousand Rice Bowls (1962)
 The Forever Christmas Tree (1963)
 Sumi's Prize (1964)
 The Sea of Gold, and Other Tales from Japan (1965)
 In-Between Miya (1967)
 Hisako's Mysteries (1969)
 Sumi and the Goat and the Tokyo Express (1969)
 Makoto, The Smallest Boy (1970)
 Journey to Topaz: A Story of the Japanese American Evacuation (1971)
 Samurai of Gold Hill (1972)
 The Birthday Visitor (1975)
 The Rooster who Understood Japanese (1976)
 The Bracelet (1976)
 Journey Home (1978) (originally published as a short story)
 Jar of Dreams (1981)
 Desert Exile: The Uprooting of a Japanese-American Family (Autobiography) (1982)
 The Best Bad Thing (1983)
 The Happiest Ending (1985)
 Picture Bride (1987)
 Two Foolish Cats (1987)
 The Terrible Leak (1990)
 The Big Book for Peace (1990) (Illustrated by Allen Say)
 Invisible Thread: An Autobiography (1991)
 The Magic Purse (1993)
 The Wise Old Woman (1994)

References

External links

Yoshiko Uchida papers and photographs (some materials available online) at The Bancroft Library
Guide to the Yoshiko Uchida papers at the University of Oregon

1921 births
1992 deaths
People from Alameda, California
Japanese-American internees
American educators of Japanese descent
American writers of Japanese descent
American women novelists
American women writers of Asian descent
American autobiographers
American novelists of Asian descent
American short story writers
American women short story writers
American short story writers of Asian descent
University of California, Berkeley alumni
Smith College alumni
Writers from the San Francisco Bay Area
20th-century American novelists
20th-century American women writers
Women autobiographers
20th-century American short story writers
Novelists from California
American women non-fiction writers
20th-century American non-fiction writers